The 9th Annual Channel O Music Video Awards were held at Walter Sisulu Square in Kliptown, Soweto, Johannesburg, South Africa on 17 November 2012. The nominees were unveiled at an announcement party in Johannesburg on 21 September 2012. Kenyan hip hop group Camp Mulla topped the list with four nominations, but failed to bring home an award. Among those who will be performing are Davido, Ice Prince, Khuli Chana, M.anifest, Camp Mulla and Zeus. PRO released his single "Makasana".

Nominees and winners
Winners are in bold text.

Video of the Year
 DJ Zinhle ft Busiswa – My name Is
 Khuli Chana ft Notshi – Tswa Daar
 Toya Delazy – Pump It On
/ Lizha James ft Pérola – Leva Boy
 Big Nelo – Sente O Beat
 D’Banj – Oliver Twist
 Brymo – Ara
 Sarkodie ft. Obrafour – Saa Okodie No
 Camp Mulla – Fresh All Day
/ AY ft Romeo & Lamyia – Speak With Your Body

Best Male Video
 Khuli Chana ft Notshi – Tswa Daar
Pro – Makasana
 Big Nelo – Sente O Beat
 D’Banj – Oliver Twist
/ AY ft. Romeo & Lamyia – Speak With Your Body

Best Female Video
 Zahara – Loliwe
/ Lizha James ft Perola – Leva Boy
 Tiwa Savage – Love Me, Love Me, Love Me
 Mo’Cheddah ft. Phenom – See Me
/ Keko ft. Madtraxx – Make You Dance

Best Newcomer
 Toya Delazy – Pump It On
 Davido – Dami Duro
 E.L. – Turn The Lights Down
 Camp Mulla ft. Collo – Party Don't Stop
 Donald – I Deserve

Best Duo, Group or Featuring
 Micasa – Heavenly Sent
/ Liquideep – Still
/ Buffalo Souljah ft. Cabo Snoop – Styra Inonyengesa
/ P-Square ft. Akon and May D – Chop My Money
 Camp Mulla – Fresh All Day

Best Dance
 DJ Zinhle ft. Busiswa – My name Is
 DJ Cleo – Facebook
OS 3 ft. Tcholoby – Mokongo
 Davido – Dami Duro
 Bucie – Get Over It
 CPwaa – Hmmm

Best Ragga Dancehall
// HHP ft Lutan Fyah & Omar Retnu – Baheitane (Remix)
/ Buffalo Souljah ft. Cabo Snoop – Styra Inonyengesa
/ Ice Prince ft. Gyptian - Magician (Remix)
 Orezi – Booty Bounce
 Wyre – Dancehall Party

Best African Pop
 Jozi – Ugologo
 DJ Sbu ft. Zahara – Lengoma
/ Gal Level ft. Toniks – Money
 Brymo – Ara
 Maurice Kirya – I Don’t Want To Fight

Best Southern African
 Cashtime Fam – Shut it down (Stundee)
 HHP – Bosso
 Shota ft. Shana – Taking You Home
 Zeus – Dancing Shoes
/ Paul G ft. Maezee – The Feeling
 Shugasmakx ft. Moneoa – Take It Easy

Best West African
/ D-Black ft. Mo’Cheddah – Falling
 Wizkid – "Pakurumo"
 Sarkodie ft. Obrafour – Saa Okodie No
 Naeto C – I Gentle
 Wande Coal – Private Trips

Best East African
/ Keko ft. Madtraxx – Make You Dance
 Camp Mulla ft. Collo - Party Don’t Stop
/ AY ft Sauti Sol – I Don’t Want To Be Alone
/ K'naan and Nas – Nothing To Lose
 Navio – One & Only

Best Hip Hop
 Khuli Chana ft Notshi – Tswa Daar
 L-Tido – Smash
 Ice Prince – Superstar
 M.anifest – Makaa Maka
/K'naan ft. Nas – Nothing To Lose

Best R&B
 Lloyd Cele – Hero
/ Lizha James ft Perola – Leva Boy
 Flavour ft. Tiwa Savage – Oyi
 2Face – Be There
 Habida ft. Cannibal – My Reason

Best Kwaito
Kabelo ft. Professor – Amapantsula’Ajabulile
 Spikiri ft. Various artists – Ngeke Balunge
 Big Nuz – Serious
/ EES ft. Mandoza – Ayoba
/ The Dogg ft. Brickz – Tromentos

Special Recognition
 Oskido

References

External links 
Channel O Music Video Awards Official website

2012 music awards
2012 in Africa